From Osaka came the 'musical anarchist' , who sang in a style called Goshu ondo.  With the backing of the now disbanded Spiritual Unity, Tadamaru broke out of the festival circuit with his only album, Ullambana, released in 1991. Ullambana is a Sanskrit word that refers to a Buddhism sutra, and is the origin of the Japanese word Urabonne whose shortened form Bon or Obon is now widely used throughout Japan.  Tadamaru's music is characterized as a radical new workout of summer festival music from Kansai area of Japan.

The song Yui Maru Bushi from the album can be found here:
 http://www.bbc.co.uk/radio3/world/guidejapan2.shtml
 https://www.youtube.com/watch?v=r1W7EGULc6s
Tadamaru retired in 1995 and passed his name to one of his pupils who now sings as Tadamaru Sakuragawa II (二代目 桜川唯丸).

Music of Japan

Discography 

 Ullambana（1990）

References 

 World Music Volume 2 Latin and North America Caribbean India Asia and: Latin and North America,...by Simon Broughton, Mark Ellingham

Living people
1938 births